Vibra Bank was a bank in Chula Vista, California opened on July 23, 2008. It was the only bank targeting the Latino community in San Diego County. After a year of operations, Vibra Bank reported total assets of $36.9 million which includes net loans of $22 million. Vibra Bank was acquired by Pacific Commerce Bank in 2015.

References

External links

Banks based in California
Defunct banks of the United States
Companies based in Chula Vista, California